MCAP may refer to:

 MCAP as an abbreviation for Market capitalization
 Mercyhurst Center for Applied Politics
 Millbrook Commonwealth Action Programme, a programme of the Commonwealth of Nations
 Movement for Change and Prosperity, a political party in Montserrat